Klos or Kłos is the surname of the following people

Elmar Klos (1910–1993), Czech film director 
Fabian Klos (born 1987), German football striker
Felix Klos (born 1992), American-Dutch historian, political scientist and author
Karol Kłos (born 1989), Polish volleyball player
Oger Klos (born 1993), Dutch football midfielder
Robert Kłos (born 1982), Polish football midfielder
Stanley L. Klos (born 1954), American basketball player, businessman, and historical preservationist
Stefan Klos (born 1971), German football goalkeeper
Tomasz Kłos (born 1973), Polish football defender
Vladimir Klos, Czech-born German ballet dancer

Surnames from given names